"I Can Go Deep" is a song by American R&B group Silk. The song was released as a single for the group's self-titled second album Silk (1995), as well as the third promotional single for the soundtrack to the 1994 film A Low Down Dirty Shame. Gary "Lil G" Jenkins sings lead.

The song peaked at number seventy-one on the Billboard Hot 100 chart.

Track listing
CD
"I Can Go Deep" (LP Version) - 6:22
"I Can Go Deep" (Low Down Remix) - 6:10
"I Can Go Deep" (Mellow Mix) - 6:22
"I Can Go Deep" (Low Down Remix [Quiet Storm]) - 6:09
"I Can Go Deep" (LP Instrumental) - 6:22
"Birthday Girl" - 3:45

Chart performance

Personnel
Information taken from Discogs.
guitar – Rob Cunningham
keyboards – Trent Thomas
mixing – Tony Maserati, Chris Trevett
production – Mike "Nice" Chapman
production (additional) – Art & Rhythm, Trent Thomas
remixing – Trent Thomas
writers - Anthony Evers

Notes

1994 singles
1994 songs
Silk (group) songs
Jive Records singles